Gargi Banerjee (born 20 July 1961 in Calcutta, India) is a former Test and One Day International cricketer who represented India. She made her international debut at the age of 16 at the Eden Gardens in a World Cup match against England and played for West Bengal in India's domestic league prior to her international appearance.

Early Days

A mischievous girl and an avid sports lover, during her days at YWCA (Young Women Christian Association), she played badminton, basketball and football. A cricket novice, Gargi enrolled for the cricket trial at YWCA and got selected to join the cricket coaching camp in 1976. Her supportive family never restricted her from playing any sports. Despite cricket being considered as ‘a gentle men game’, Gargi's brother encouraged her throughout. She was drafted in to the Bengal side and in 2 years she made the jump to the national team for the 1978 World Cup.

Cricket Career

She played a total of 12 Tests and 26 ODIs.
and holds the record for scoring the most number of test runs in a career without a contributing century (614 runs). In her illustrious cricketing career, she overcame her  unimpressive ODI achievements (15.73 from 26 matches over eight years) and later played her first Test, in a match where India fielded five other newcomers and Australia seven. She scored a half-century in the second innings and another one in the fourth Test of the series drawn 0-0. After two fifties, and incredible 6 for 9 in Cuttack, against New Zealand, Gargi was picked for India's first tour of England - in 1986 - where she scored 60 and 75 in the Blackpool Test. Sandhya Agarwal's century overshadowed Gargi's performance, but she made it to Australia in  India's next tour in 1991.

Accomplishments

Impressed by her batting, late Madhavrao Scindia offered Gargi a job contract at the cricket field. She helped to raise the bar of women's cricket in India by being associated with Indian cricket in various capacities. As the chairperson of Indian women's cricket team selection committee (2011-2014) she gave chances to budding women cricketers. Gargi felt that the more number of matches the youngsters played, will help them understand the difference between domestic and international circuit. In April 2017, she was bestowed with the prestigious honorary life membership of the Marylebone Cricket Club (MCC). Inspiration to young girls who are aspiring cricketers, Gargi Banerji continues to boost the morale of girls who are inclined to make cricket as a viable career option.

References

External links
Gargi Banerji's Scorecard

1963 births
India women One Day International cricketers
India women Test cricketers
Living people
Cricketers from Kolkata
Railways women cricketers
University of Calcutta alumni
20th-century Indian women
20th-century Indian people
Sportswomen from Kolkata